Martin Bielz (born 12 August 1936) is a Romanian rower. He competed in two events at the 1960 Summer Olympics.

References

1936 births
Living people
Romanian male rowers
Olympic rowers of Romania
Rowers at the 1960 Summer Olympics
People from Sighișoara